General elections were held in Malta on 9 and 10 June 1924. The Maltese Political Union and the Constitutional Party both won 10 of the 32 seats.

Electoral system
The elections were held using the single transferable vote system, whilst suffrage was limited to men meeting certain property qualifications.

Results

References

General elections in Malta
Malta
1924 in Malta
June 1924 events
1924 elections in the British Empire